Kyle Bradley (born 14 February 1999) is a Scottish footballer who plays for Pollok F.C. in the West of Scotland Football League.

He also spent spells at Rangers, on loan at Clyde and Annan Athletic, and later at East Kilbride F.C.

Career
Bradley signed a new contract in March 2016 which tied him to the club until May 2018. He made his debut for Rangers as a substitute in a Scottish Premiership match against St Johnstone on 21 May 2017, replacing Martyn Waghorn in the 85th minute. On 4 July 2017, Bradley joined Scottish League Two side Clyde on loan until January 2018.

In September 2018, Bradley joined Annan Athletic on loan.

On 17 May 2019, it was announced that Bradley would be released by Rangers. Bradley was later signed on a permanent basis by Annan.

Bradley signed for Lowland League team East Kilbride on 9 October 2020.

In May 2021, Bradley signed for West of Scotland Football League side Pollok F.C. on an initial one-year deal, making his debut in their opening league match against Blantyre Victoria in July.

Career statistics

References

External links

1999 births
Living people
Scottish footballers
Association football defenders
Rangers F.C. players
Clyde F.C. players
Annan Athletic F.C. players
Scottish Professional Football League players